The 2013 South African Figure Skating Championships were held in Cape Town on 1–2 March 2013. Skaters competed in the discipline of ladies' singles.

Senior results

Ladies

External links
 info
 2013 South African Championships results

South African Figure Skating Championships, 2013
South African Figure Skating Championships
South African Figure Skating Championships, 2013